Megachile aethiops is a species of bee in the family Megachilidae. It was described by Frederick Smith in 1853. The species is known only from Australia.

References

aethiops
Insects described in 1853